Falecalcitriol (INN) is an analog of calcitriol. It has a higher potency both in vivo and in vitro systems, and longer duration of action in vivo.

References

Secosteroids
Trifluoromethyl compounds
Vitamin D